The 1925 Carnegie Tech Tartans football team was an American football team that represented the Carnegie Institute of Technology (now known as Carnegie Mellon University) as an independent during the 1925 college football season. In its 11th season under head coach Walter Steffen, the team compiled a 5–2–1 record and outscored opponents by a total of 161 to 47. The team played its first two home games at Tech Field in Pittsburgh and its last two at Forbes Field in the same city.

Schedule

References

Carnegie Tech
Carnegie Mellon Tartans football seasons
Carnegie Tech Tartans football